A Russian fairy tale or folktale (skazka; "story"; plural ) is a fairy tale from Russia.

Various sub-genres of skazka exist.  A volshebnaya skazka [волше́бная ска́зка] (literally "magical tale") is considered a magical tale. Skazki o zhivotnykh are tales about animals and bytovye skazki are tales about household life. These variations of skazki give the term more depth and detail different types of folktales.

Similarly to Western European traditions, especially the  German-language collection published by the Brothers Grimm, Russian folklore was first collected by scholars and systematically studied in the 19th century. Russian fairy tales and folk tales were cataloged (compiled, grouped, numbered and published) by Alexander Afanasyev in his 1850s Narodnye russkie skazki. Scholars of folklore still refer to his collected texts when citing the number of a skazka plot. An exhaustive analysis of the stories, describing the stages of their plots and the classification of the characters based on their functions, was developed later, in the first half of the 20th century, by Vladimir Propp (1895-1970).

History 
Appearing in the latter half of the eighteenth century, fairy tales became widely popular as they spread throughout the country. Literature was considered an important factor in the education of Russian children who were meant to grow from the moral lessons in the tales. During the 18th Century Romanticism period, poets such as Alexander Pushkin and Pyotr Yershov began to define the Russian folk spirit with their stories. Throughout the 1860s, despite the rise of Realism, fairy tales still remained a beloved source of literature which drew inspiration from writers such as Hans Christian Andersen. The messages in the fairy tales began to take a different shape once Joseph Stalin rose to power under the Communist movement.

Effects of Communism 
Fairy tales were thought to have a strong influence over children which is why Joseph Stalin decided to place restrictions upon the literature distributed under his rule. The tales created in the mid 1900s were used to impose Socialist beliefs and values as seen in numerous popular stories. In comparison to stories from past centuries, fairy tales in the USSR had taken a more modern spin as seen in tales such as in Anatoliy Mityaev's Grishka and the Astronaut. Past tales such as Alexander Afanasyev's The Midnight Dance involved nobility and focused on romance. Grishka and the Astronaut, though, examines modern Russian's passion to travel through space as seen in reality with the Space Race between Russia and the United States. The new tales included a focus on innovations and inventions that could help characters in place of magic which was often used as a device in past stories.

Influences 

In Russia, the fairy tale is one sub-genre of folklore and is usually told in the form of a short story. They are used to express different aspects of the Russian culture. In Russia, fairy tales were propagated almost exclusively orally, until the 17th century, as written literature was reserved for religious purposes. In their oral form, fairy tales allowed the freedom to explore the different methods of narration. The separation from written forms led Russians to develop techniques that were effective at creating dramatic and interesting stories. Such techniques have developed into consistent elements now found in popular literary works; They distinguish the genre of Russian fairy tales. Fairy tales were not confined to a particular socio-economic class and appealed to mass audiences, which resulted in them becoming a trademark of Russian culture.

Cultural influences on Russian fairy tales have been unique and based on imagination. Isaac Bashevis Singer, a Polish-American author and Nobel Prize winner, claims that, “You don't ask questions about a tale, and this is true for the folktales of all nations. They were not told as fact or history but as a means to entertain the listener, whether he was a child or an adult. Some contain a moral, others seem amoral or even antimoral, Some constitute fables on man's follies and mistakes, others appear pointless." They were created to entertain the reader.

Russian fairy tales are extremely popular and are still used to inspire artistic works today. The Sleeping Beauty  is still played in New York at the American Ballet Theater and has roots to original Russian fairy tales from 1890. Mr. Ratmansky’s, the artist-in-residence for the play, gained inspiration for the play's choreography from its Russian background.

Formalism 
From the 1910s through the 1930s, a wave of literary criticism emerged in Russia, called Russian formalism by critics of the new school of thought.

Analysis 
Many different approaches of analyzing the morphology of the fairy tale have appeared in scholarly works. Differences in analyses can arise between synchronic and diachronic approaches. Other differences can come from the relationship between story elements. After elements are identified, a structuralist can propose relationships between those elements. A paradigmatic relationship between elements is associative in nature whereas a syntagmatic relationship refers to the order and position of the elements relative to the other elements.

Motif 
Before the period of Russian formalism, beginning in 1910, Alexander Veselovksky called the motif the "simplest narrative unit." Veselovsky proposed that the different plots of a folktale arise from the unique combinations of motifs.

Motif analysis was also part of Stith Thompson's approach to folkloristics. Thompson's research into the motifs of folklore culminated in the publication of the Motif-Index of Folk Literature.

Structural 
In 1919, Viktor Shklovsky published his essay titled "The Relationship Between Devices of Plot Construction and General Devices of Style". As a major proponent during Russian formalism, Shklovsky was one of the first scholars to criticize the failing methods of literary analysis and report on a syntagmatic approach to folktales. In his essay he claims, "It is my purpose to stress not so much the similarity of motifs, which I consider of little significance, as the similarity in the plot schemata."

Syntagmatic analysis, championed by Vladimir Propp, is the approach in which the elements of the fairy tale are analyzed in the order that they appear in the story. Wanting to overcome what he thought was arbitrary and subjective analysis of folklore by motif, Propp published his book Morphology of the Folktale in 1928. The book specifically states that Propp finds a dilemma in Veselovsky's definition of a motif; it fails because it can be broken down into smaller units, contradicting its definition. In response, Propp pioneered a specific breakdown that can be applied to most Aarne-Thompson type tales classified with numbers 300-749. This methodology gives rise to Propp's  31 functions, or actions, of the fairy tale. Propp proposes that the functions are the fundamental units the story and that there are exactly 31 distinct functions. He observed in his analysis of 100 Russian fairy tales that tales almost always adhere to the order of the functions. The traits of the characters, or dramatis personae, involved in the actions are second to the action actually being carried out. This also follows his finding that while some functions may be missing between different stories, the order is kept the same for all the Russian fairy tales he analyzed.

Alexander Nikiforov, like Shklovsky and Propp, was a folklorist in 1920s Soviet Russia. His early work also identified the benefits of a syntagmatic analysis of fairy tale elements. In his 1926 paper titled "The Morphological Study of Folklore", Nikiforov states that "Only the functions of the character, which constitute his dramatic role in the folk tale, are invariable." Since Nikiforov's essay was written almost 2 years before Propp's publication of Morphology of the Folktale, scholars have speculated that the idea of the function, widely attributed to Propp, could have first been recognized by Nikiforov. One source claims that Nikiforov's work was "not developed into a systematic analysis of syntagmatics" and failed to "keep apart structural principles and atomistic concepts". Nikiforov's work on folklore morphology was never pursued beyond his paper.

Writers and collectors

Alexander Afanasyev 
Alexander Afanasyev began writing fairy tales at a time when folklore was viewed as simple entertainment. His interest in folklore stemmed from his interest in ancient Slavic mythology. During the 1850s, Afanasyev began to record part of his collection from tales dating to Boguchar, his birthplace. More of his collection came from the work of Vladimir Dhal and the Russian Geographical Society who collected tales from all around the Russian Empire. Afanasyev was a part of the few who attempted to create a written collection of Russian folklore. This lack in collections of folklore was due to the control that the Church Slavonic had on printed literature in Russia, which allowed for only religious texts to be spread. To this, Afanasyev replied, “There is a million times more morality, truth and human love in my folk legends than in the sanctimonious sermons delivered by Your Holiness!”

Between 1855 and 1863, Afanasyev edited Popular Russian Tales[Narodnye russkie skazki], which had been modeled after the Grimm's Tales. This publication had a vast cultural impact over Russian scholars by establishing a desire for folklore studies in Russia. The rediscovery of Russian folklore through written text led to a generation of great Russian authors to come forth. Some of these authors include Leo Tolstoy and Fyodor Dostoevsky. Folktales were quickly produced in written text and adapted. Since the production of this collection, Russian tales remain understood and recognized all over Russia.

Alexander Pushkin 
Alexander Pushkin is known as one of Russia’s leading writers and poets. He is known for popularizing fairy tales in Russia and changed Russian literature by writing stories no one before him could. Pushkin is considered Russia’s Shakespeare as, during a time when most of the Russian population was illiterate, he gave Russian’s the ability to desire in a less-strict Christian and a more pagan way through his fairy tales.

Pushkin gained his love for Russian fairy tales from his childhood nurse, Ariana Rodionovna, who told him stories from her village when he was young. His stories served importance to Russians past his death in 1837, especially during times political turmoil during the start of the 20th century, in which, “Pushkin’s verses gave children the Russian language in its most perfect magnificence, a language which they may never hear or speak again, but which will remain with them as an eternal treasure.”

The value of his fairy tales was established a hundred years after Pushkin’s death when the Soviet Union declared him a national poet. Pushkin’s work was previously banned during the Czarist rule. During the Soviet Union, his tales were seen acceptable for education, since Pushkin’s fairy tales spoke of the poor class and had anti-clerical tones.

Corpus
According to scholarship, some of "most popular or most significant" types of Russian Magic Tales (or Wonder Tales) are the following:

Footnotes

References

Further reading

 Лутовинова, Е.И. (2018). Тематические группы сюжетов русских народных волшебных сказок. Педагогическое искусство, (2): 62-68. URL: https://cyberleninka.ru/article/n/tematicheskie-gruppy-syuzhetov-russkih-narodnyh-volshebnyh-skazok (дата обращения: 27.08.2021). (in Russian)

The Three Kingdoms (ATU 301):
 Лызлова Анастасия Сергеевна (2019). Cказки о трех царствах (медном, серебряном и золотом) в лубочной литературе и фольклорной традиции [FAIRY TALES ABOUT THREE KINGDOMS (THE COPPER, SILVER AND GOLD ONES) IN POPULAR LITERATURE AND RUSSIAN FOLK TRADITION]. Проблемы исторической поэтики, 17 (1): 26-44. URL: https://cyberleninka.ru/article/n/ckazki-o-treh-tsarstvah-mednom-serebryanom-i-zolotom-v-lubochnoy-literature-i-folklornoy-traditsii (дата обращения: 24.09.2021). (In Russian)
 Матвеева, Р. П. (2013). Русские сказки на сюжет «Три подземных царства» в сибирском репертуаре [RUSSIAN FAIRY TALES ON THE PLOT « THREE UNDERGROUND KINGDOMS» IN THE SIBERIAN REPERTOIRE]. Вестник Бурятского государственного университета. Философия, (10): 170-175. URL: https://cyberleninka.ru/article/n/russkie-skazki-na-syuzhet-tri-podzemnyh-tsarstva-v-sibirskom-repertuare (дата обращения: 24.09.2021). (In Russian)
 Терещенко Анна Васильевна (2017). Фольклорный сюжет «Три царства» в сопоставительном аспекте: на материале русских и селькупских сказок [COMPARATIVE ANALYSIS OF THE FOLKLORE PLOT “THREE STOLEN PRINCESSES”: RUSSIAN AND SELKUP FAIRY TALES DATA]. Вестник Томского государственного педагогического университета, (6 (183)): 128-134. URL: https://cyberleninka.ru/article/n/folklornyy-syuzhet-tri-tsarstva-v-sopostavitelnom-aspekte-na-materiale-russkih-i-selkupskih-skazok (дата обращения: 24.09.2021). (In Russian)

Crafty Knowledge (ATU 325):
 Трошкова Анна Олеговна (2019). "Сюжет "Хитрая наука" (сус 325) в русской волшебной сказке" [THE PLOT “THE MAGICIAN AND HIS PUPIL” (NO. 325 OF THE COMPARATIVE INDEX OF PLOTS) IN THE RUSSIAN FAIRY TALE]. Вестник Марийского государственного университета, 13 (1 (33)): 98-107. URL: https://cyberleninka.ru/article/n/syuzhet-hitraya-nauka-sus-325-v-russkoy-volshebnoy-skazke (дата обращения: 24.09.2021). (In Russian)
 Troshkova, A.O. "Plot CIP 325 Crafty Lore / ATU 325 «The Magician and His Pupil» in Catalogues of Tale Types by A. Aarne (1910), Aarne — Thompson (1928, 1961), G. Uther (2004), N. P. Andreev (1929) and L. G. Barag (1979)". In: Traditional culture. 2019. Vol. 20. No. 5. pp. 85—88. DOI: 10.26158/TK.2019.20.5.007 (In Russian).
  (In Russian)

Mark the Rich or Marko Bogatyr (ATU 461):
 Кузнецова Вера Станиславовна (2017). Легенда о Христе в составе сказки о Марко Богатом: устные и книжные источники славянских повествований [LEGEND OF CHRIST WITHIN THE FOLKTALE ABOUT MARKO THE RICH: ORAL AND BOOK SOURCES OF SLAVIC NARRATIVES]. Вестник славянских культур, 46 (4): 122-134. URL: https://cyberleninka.ru/article/n/legenda-o-hriste-v-sostave-skazki-o-marko-bogatom-ustnye-i-knizhnye-istochniki-slavyanskih-povestvovaniy (дата обращения: 24.09.2021). (In Russian)
 Кузнецова Вера Станиславовна (2019). Разновидности сюжета о Марко Богатом (AaTh 930) в восточно- и южнославянских записях [VERSIONS OF THE PLOT ABOUT MARKO THE RICH (AATH 930) IN THE EAST- AND SOUTH SLAVIC TEXTS]. Вестник славянских культур, 52 (2): 104-116. URL: https://cyberleninka.ru/article/n/raznovidnosti-syuzheta-o-marko-bogatom-aath-930-v-vostochno-i-yuzhnoslavyanskih-zapisyah (дата обращения: 24.09.2021).

External links

 Collection of Russian folk tales in Russian..

Russian literature